Stegelytrini is a tribe of leafhoppers in the subfamily Deltocephalinae. There are 30 genera and over 80 species in Stegelytrini. Some authors consider Stegelytrini to be its own subfamily, but Zahniser & Dietrich (2013) consider it to be the earliest divergent lineage of Deltocephalinae.

Genera 
There are currently 30 described genera in Stegelytrini:

References 

Deltocephalinae